The 2018 Porsche Michelin GT3 Cup Challenge Australia Series was an Australian motor racing competition for Porsche 911 GT3 Cup cars. It was the eleventh running of the Porsche GT3 Cup Challenge Australia. The series commenced at The Bend Motorsport Park on 13 April and concluded at Sydney Motorsport Park on 22 September. 2017 series winner Jordan Love opted not to defend his title, instead concentrating his efforts on the 2018 Porsche Carrera Cup Australia.

The series was won by Simon Fallon. with Daniel Stutterd and Christian Pancione winning the Pro-Am and B classes respectively.

Team and drivers

All A class teams used Porsche 911 GT3 Cup Type 997 (MY2010-2012) all B class team used Porsche 911 GT3 Cup Type 997 (MY2006-2009). They all used Pirelli Tyres.

Race calendar
The series was contested over six rounds.

Series standings 
The series was won by Simon Fallon. Fallon also won the Pro class, Danny Stutterd won the Pro-Am class and Christian Pancione won Class B.

See also
2018 Porsche Carrera Cup Australia

References

External links
 

2018 in Australian motorsport
Porsche GT3 Cup Challenge Australia